Balmaceda is a Chilean village located south east of Coyhaique in Aysén Region. Balmaceda has around 500 inhabitants, and has Aysén Region's largest airport and meteorological station, Balmaceda Airport.

History
The first settlers arrived into the zone in early-20th century after being expelled from Argentina since the borders between Chile and Argentina were drawn in 1902. In 1917 Balmaceda was officially founded and was named after the Chilean president José Manuel Balmaceda. Balmaceda was initially one of the largest inland Chilean settlements in what is now the Aysén Region.

Transport
Balmaceda is linked to Route 40, in Argentina, via a 102 km gravel extension road (not pavement - May/2019 info).

Climate 
The climate of Balmaceda is an unusual combination of the dry-summer Mediterranean characteristic more typical of Central Chile with the subpolar oceanic characteristics more typical of southern Chile. Uniquely to the region surrounding Lago General Carrera, it has the extremely rare cold-summer Mediterranean climate (Köppen Csc, bordeline Dsc), with short, though dry summers, and long, snowy though not severe winters. Precipitation, however, is markedly lower than on the coast of Chile owing to the rain shadow of the Andes, being about one-sixth to one-seventh what is received on the coast at the same latitude. Snow is very common during the winter but rarely stays on the ground.

Notes

References

Populated places established in 1917
Populated places in Coyhaique Province